Adoxophyes parastropha is a moth of the family Tortricidae. It is found in India, Nepal and Vietnam.

References

Moths described in 1912
Adoxophyes
Moths of Asia